Steve Albini (pronounced ; born July 22, 1962) is an American musician, record producer, audio engineer and music journalist. He was a member of Big Black, Rapeman and Flour, and is a member of Shellac. He is the founder, owner and principal engineer of Electrical Audio, a recording studio complex in Chicago. In 2018, Albini estimated that he had worked on several thousand albums over his career. He has worked with acts such as Nirvana, Pixies, the Breeders, PJ Harvey, and former Led Zeppelin members Jimmy Page and Robert Plant.

Albini is also known for his outspoken views on the music industry, having stated repeatedly that it financially exploits artists and homogenizes their sound. Nearly alone among well-known producers and musicians, Albini refuses to take ongoing royalties from other bands recording in his studio, feeling that a producer's job is to record the music to the band's desires, and that paying producers as if they had contributed artistically to an album is unethical.

Early life
Albini was born in Pasadena, California, to Gina (née Martinelli) and Frank Addison Albini. In his birth certificate, the middle name section says "(None)" as his father refused to leave it blank. His father was a wildfire researcher. He has two siblings. In his youth, Albini's family moved often, before settling in the college town of Missoula, Montana in 1974. Albini is Italian American and part of his family comes from the Piedmont region of Northern Italy.

While recovering from a broken leg, Albini began playing bass guitar and participated in bass lessons in high school for one week. He was introduced to the Ramones by a schoolmate on a field trip when he was 14 or 15. He felt it was the best music he had ever heard and bought every Ramones recording available to him, and credits his music career to hearing their first album. He said: "I was baffled and thrilled by music like the Ramones, the Sex Pistols, Pere Ubu, Devo and all those contemporaneous, inspirational punk bands without wanting to try to mimic them."

During his teenage years, Albini played in bands such as the Montana punk band Just Ducky, the Chicago band Small Irregular Pieces of Aluminum, Stations, and another band that record label Touch and Go/Quarterstick Records explained "he [Albini] is paying us not to mention".

After graduating from Hellgate High School, Albini moved to Evanston, Illinois, to attend college at the Medill School of Journalism at Northwestern University (NU), where he attained a degree in journalism. Albini said he studied painting in college with Ed Paschke, someone he calls a brilliant educator and "one of the only people in college who actually taught me anything".

In the Chicago area, Albini was active as a writer in local zines such as Matter and Forced Exposure, covering the then-nascent punk rock scene, and gained a reputation for the iconoclastic nature of his articles. Around the same time, he began recording musicians and engineered his first album in 1981. He co-managed Ruthless Records (Chicago) with John Kezdy of the Effigies and Jon Babbin (Criminal IQ Records). According to Albini, he maintained a "straight job" for five years until 1987, working in a photography studio as a photograph retouch artist.

Performing career

1981–1987: Big Black 
In 1981, Albini formed Big Black while he was a student at NU, and recorded Lungs, the band's debut EP, on Ruthless Records (Chicago), a label he co-managed with Babbin and Kezdy. Albini played all of the instruments on Lungs except the saxophone, played by his friend John Bohnen. The Bulldozer (1983) EP was released on Ruthless and Fever Records.

Jeff Pezzati and Santiago Durango, of Chicago band Naked Raygun, and live drummer Pat Byrne joined shortly thereafter, and the band—along with a drum machine, the Roland TR-606, credited as "Roland"—released the EP Racer-X in 1984, after touring and signing a new contract with the Homestead Records business. Pezzati commenced recording the "Il Duce" 7-inch single with the band, but returned to his original band before it was completed. Pezzati was replaced on bass by Dave Riley, with whom the group recorded their debut full-length album, Atomizer (1986). The "Il Duce" recording was eventually finished with Riley as bassist; the band also released The Hammer Party album while signed to Homestead, which was a compilation of the Lungs and Bulldozer EPs.

Big Black left the Homestead label for Touch and Go Records in late 1985/early 1986, and recorded the Headache EP and the 7-inch single, Heartbeat between June and August 1986—both were released the following year. Also in 1986, a live album titled Sound of Impact was released on the Not/Blast First label. The accompanying booklet provides insight into the band's influences; Albini cited bands such as Ramones, The Birthday Party, The Stooges, Suicide, SPK, Minor Threat, Whitehouse, Link Wray, Pere Ubu, Chrome, Rudimentary Peni, The 4-Skins, Throbbing Gristle, Skrewdriver, the Ex, Minimal Man, U.S. Chaos, Gang Green, Tommi Stumpff, Swans and Bad Brains.

In 1987, the band released their second studio album, Songs About Fucking, as well as the He's a Whore / The Model 7-inch single, both on Touch and Go. Big Black disbanded shortly after a period of extensive touring that year in support of Songs About Fucking. Durango enrolled in law school and became a lawyer.

1987–1988: Rapeman
Albini formed Rapeman in 1987: the band consisted of Albini (vocals, guitar), Rey Washam (drums), and David Wm. Sims (bass). Both Washam and Sims were previously members of Scratch Acid.  The band was named after a Japanese comic book. They broke up after the release of two 7-inch singles, "Hated Chinee b/w Marmoset" (1988) and "Inki's Butt Crack b/w Song Number One" (1989), one EP titled Budd (1988) and the Two Nuns and a Pack Mule album, also released in 1988 on Touch and Go.

In a 2020 interview, Albini expressed regret for the name of the band, saying that he didn't feel he had been "held to account for being in a band called Rapeman". He added that "it was a flippant choice", calling it unconscionable and indefensible. He likened it to getting a bad tattoo.

1992–present: Shellac 
Albini formed Shellac in 1992, with bandmates Bob Weston (formerly of Volcano Suns) and Todd Trainer (of Rifle Sport, Breaking Circus and Brick Layer Cake). They initially released three EPs: The Rude Gesture: A Pictorial History (1993), Uranus (1993) and The Bird Is the Most Popular Finger (1994). The first two EP releases were on Touch and Go, while the third EP was a Drag City label release.

Two years after formation, the Japanese label NUX Organization released a Japan-exclusive live album, Live in Tokyo. The live album was followed by five studio albums: At Action Park (1994), Terraform (1998), 1000 Hurts (2000), Excellent Italian Greyhound (2007) and Dude Incredible (2014). All of Shellac's studio albums were released on vinyl as well as CD.

Recording career

Since the early 1990s, Albini has been best known as a record producer; however, he dislikes the term and prefers to receive no credit on album sleeves or notes. When credited, he prefers the term "recording engineer".

In 2004, Albini estimated that he has engineered the recording of 1,500 albums, mostly by underground musicians. By 2018, his estimate had increased to several thousand. More prominent artists that Albini has worked with include: Foxy Shazam, Nirvana, Pixies, The Breeders, Godspeed You! Black Emperor, Mogwai, The Jesus Lizard, Don Caballero, PJ Harvey, The Wedding Present, Joanna Newsom, Superchunk, Low, Dirty Three, Jawbreaker, Neurosis, Cloud Nothings, Bush, Chevelle, Jimmy Page and Robert Plant (as Page and Plant), Helmet, Fred Schneider, The Stooges, Owls, Manic Street Preachers, Jarvis Cocker, The Cribs, the Fleshtones, Nina Nastasia, The Frames, The Membranes, Cheap Trick, Motorpsycho, Slint, mclusky, Labradford, Veruca Salt, Zao, The Auteurs and Spare Snare.

Following the release of Schneider's album Just Fred, the Vinyl District's Joseph Neff wrote: "The reality is that when enlisted by the big leagues, Albini took his job just as seriously as when he was assisting on the debut recording from a bunch of aspiring unknowns."

Stereogum's Tom Breihan wrote in 2012: "Even though he's [Albini] been an outspoken opponent of the major-label system (and of other underground-rock heroes), he's known to work with just about anyone who requests his service."

In February 2018, along with the Scottish lo-fi band Spare Snare, Albini presented a one-day Audio Engineers' Workshop at Chem19 Studios in Blantyre, Scotland.

Methodology

In Albini's opinion, putting producers in charge of recording sessions often destroys records, while the role of the recording engineer is to solve problems in capturing the sound of the musicians, not to threaten the artists' control over their product.

Albini's recordings have been analyzed by writers such as Michael Azerrad, who is also a musician. In Azerrad's 2001 book Our Band Could Be Your Life: Scenes from the American Indie Underground, 1981–1991, Azerrad describes Albini's work on the Pixies album Surfer Rosa: "The recordings were both very basic and very exacting: Albini used few special effects; got an aggressive, often violent guitar sound; and made sure the rhythm section slammed as one."

Production influences 
A key influence on Albini was English producer John Loder, who came to prominence in the late 1970s with a reputation for recording albums quickly and inexpensively, but nonetheless with distinctive qualities and a sensitivity towards a band's sound and aesthetic.

Albini has mentioned an admiration for ethnomusicologist Alan Lomax. Among his peers, Albini has praised his frequent collaborator (and Shellac bandmate) Bob Weston, as well as Brian Paulson and Matt Barnhart, among others.

Nirvana and In Utero

In 1993, Nirvana hired Albini for their third album, In Utero. Albini dismissed Nirvana as "R.E.M. with a fuzzbox" and "an unremarkable version of the Seattle sound". However, he accepted the job because he felt sorry for them, perceiving them as "the same sort of people as all the small-fry bands I deal with", at the mercy of their record company. Cobain said he chose Albini because he had produced two of his favorite records, Surfer Rosa (1988) by the Pixies and Pod (1990) by the Breeders. Cobain wanted to use Albini's technique of capturing the natural ambience of a room via the placement of several microphones, something previous Nirvana producers had been averse to trying. 

At Albini's recommendation, Nirvana travelled to Pachyderm Studios in Minnesota to record the album. Albini chose the studio in part due to its isolation, hoping to keep representatives of Nirvana's record label, DGC Records, away. Recording was completed in six days; Cobain had anticipated disagreements with Albini, whom he had heard "was supposedly this sexist jerk", but called the process "the easiest recording we've ever done, hands down".

Once the label and management heard the resulting recording, they were displeased with it. The members of Nirvana had mixed feelings as well: Cobain said afterward that the first time he played it at home, "I got no emotion from it", and considered re-recording the songs with more radio-friendly production. However, a month later, having listened to it more and played it for friends, he felt that it was "exactly the kind of record I would buy as a fan". The band did collectively decide that the vocals and bass were too low in the mix. They asked Albini to remix the album, but he refused, as he was happy with the results and feared that the process would lead to "a spiral of recriminations and remixes" among himself, the band and the record company. During the remastering process, engineer Bob Ludwig raised the volume of the vocals and sharpened the bass guitar sound. Additionally, R.E.M. producer Scott Litt was brought in to remix several of the songs. The final album was a critical and commercial success, and remains strongly associated with Albini, despite Albini's contention that the finished album "doesn't sound all that much like the record that was made". Asked about In Utero in 2004, Albini stated that the record label was responsible for the difficulties that marred the trajectory of the album. According to Albini, In Utero made him unpopular with major record labels, and he faced problems finding work in the year following.

Electrical Audio
Albini bought Electrical Audio, his personal recording studio, in 1995. The reason for the move to his own studio was the lack of privacy for Albini and his wife. His former studio was in their house, eventually taking over almost all the rooms, with the exception of the bedroom. Before Electrical Audio, Albini had a studio in the basement of another personal residence. Musician Robbie Fulks recalls the hassle of "running up two flights of stairs all the time from the tracking room" to where Albini was.

Albini does not receive royalties for anything he records or mixes at his own facility, unlike many other engineer/record producers with his experience and prominence. At Electrical Audio in 2004, Albini earned a daily fee of US$750 for engineering work, and drew a salary of US$24,000 a year. Azerrad referred to Albini's rates in 2001 as among the most affordable for a world-class recording studio. Following the completion of the studio's construction, Albini initially charged only for his time, allowing his friends or musicians he respected—who were willing to engineer their own recording sessions and purchase their own magnetic tape—to use his studio free. In a 2004 lecture, Albini stated that he always deals with bands directly at Electrical Audio, and answers the phone himself in the studio.

Musical influences
Albini mentioned his liking for "good guitar", saying "good noise is like orgasm". He commented: "Anybody can play notes. There's no trick. What is a trick and a good one is to make a guitar do things that don't sound like a guitar at all. The point here is stretching the boundaries." Albini has praised guitarists including Andy Gill of Gang of Four, Rowland S. Howard of Birthday Party, John McKay of Siouxsie and the Banshees, Keith Levene of Public Image Ltd, Steve Diggle and Pete Shelley of Buzzcocks, Ron Asheton of the Stooges, Paul Fox of the Ruts, Greg Ginn of Black Flag, Lyle Preslar of Minor Threat, John McGeoch of Magazine and the Banshees, and Tom Verlaine of Television.

Albini praised Andy Gill's guitar tone on Gang of Four's Entertainment!, stating:  "[he] makes six strings produce more beautiful, broken noise than anybody". He praised John McKay for his work on Siouxsie and the Banshees's The Scream, saying "only now people are trying to copy it, and even now nobody understands how that guitar player got all that pointless noise to stick together as songs". Albini cited Ron Asheton because "he made great squealy death noise feedback". He also described John McGeoch's guitar playing as "great choral swells, great scratches and buzzes, [and] great dissonant noise". He admired Tom Verlaine for his ability to "twist almost any conceivable sound out of a guitar".

Views

Music industry
Albini's opinions on the music industry, as well as on trends in indie music, have received considerable exposure. His most famous piece is the essay "The Problem with Music", which was first published in the December 1993 issue of art and criticism journal The Baffler. The essay criticizes the music industry, and specifically the major record labels of the time, for financially exploiting and deceiving their artists. In the essay's longest section, Albini runs a financial breakdown to show how a hypothetical band which sells 250,000 copies of their major-label debut album could end up making only "about 1/3 as much as they would working at a 7-11" from the album, due to all the expenditures the label makes, ostensibly on their behalf.

At a 2004 Middle Tennessee State University presentation, Albini reaffirmed his perspective on major labels, explaining that he was opposed to any form of human exploitation.

In November 2014, Albini delivered the keynote speech at the Face the Music conference in Melbourne, Australia, where he discussed the evolution of the music scene and industry since he started making music in the late 1970s. He described the pre-internet corporate music industry as "a system that ensured waste by rewarding the most profligate spendthrifts in a system specifically engineered to waste the band's money," which aimed to perpetuate its structures and business arrangements while preventing bands (except for "monumental stars") from earning a living. He contrasted it with the independent scene, which encouraged resourcefulness and established an alternative network of clubs, promoters, fanzines, DJs and labels, and allowed musicians to make a reasonable income due to the system's greater efficiency.

Music production
Albini is a supporter of analog recording over digital, as can be evidenced by a 1987 quote on the back cover of the CD version of Big Black's Songs About Fucking: "The future belongs to the analog loyalists. Fuck digital." He has maintained his support for analog recording, stating in a 2013 interview that using digital files as audio masters is "irresponsible", because such files can eventually disappear or become unusable.

In the essay "The Problem with Music", Albini also criticized music producers who lack a solid understanding of music engineering, and thus latch on to whatever is trendy at the moment, such as Pultec equalizers or compression (which he wrote "makes everything sound like a beer commercial"). He criticized producers who put vocals in the mix much higher than everything else in order to "sound more like the Beatles". He also wrote that when he hears producers and engineers use "meaningless" words like "punchy" and "warm", he feels the need to "throttle somebody."

Asked about these statements in a 2018 interview, Albini stated that, given the reduction in the power of record labels over the previous 25 years, the prevalence of producers who are there only to exert artistic control over the recording had dropped significantly. He also noted that digital recording had enabled many more people to "do productive work" as audio engineers, while noting that he himself was sticking with analog recording.

Music streaming

Albini was asked about file sharing in June 2014 and he clarified that, while he does not believe that the technological development is the "best thing" for the music industry, he does not identify with the music industry. He considers "the community, the band, the musician" as his peers, and is pleased that musicians can "get their music out to the world at no cost instantly".

As part of the Face the Music speech, Albini noted that both the corporate and independent industry models had been damaged by internet file sharing; however, he praised the spread of free music as being a "fantastic development", which allowed previously ignored music and bands to find an audience (citing the protopunk band Death as one example); the use of the internet as a distribution channel for music to be heard worldwide; and the increasing affordability of recording equipment, all of which allow bands to circumvent the traditional recording industry. Albini also argued that the increased availability of recorded music stimulates demand for live music, boosting bands' income.

Albini critiqued Jay Z's subscription-only, lossless audio streaming service Tidal in an April 2015 interview with Vulture.com, arguing that streaming services would eventually be usurped by a more convenient technology, that convenience would trump sound quality in streaming, and that audiophiles would prefer vinyl to streaming. He made the point that the internet has a history "of breaking limitations placed on its content" by making paid-for products freely available.

Music journalism
In 1983, Albini wrote for Matter, a monthly new US music magazine appeared at the time in Chicago. He wrote in each issue a chronicle called "Tired of Ugly Fat?", and also contributed articles such as  "Husker Du? Only Their Hairdresser Knows For Sure". In 1994, Albini wrote a famous letter to music critic Bill Wyman (not to be confused with rock musician Bill Wyman), which was published in the Chicago Reader, calling Wyman a "music press stooge" for having championed three Chicago-based music acts whom Albini labeled as "frauds": Liz Phair, The Smashing Pumpkins, and Urge Overkill.

While in Australia in November 2014, Albini spoke with national radio station Double J and stated that, while the state of the music industry is healthy in his view, the industry of music journalism is in crisis. Albini used the example of the media spotlight that he received after criticizing Amanda Palmer for not paying her musicians after receiving over $1 million on Kickstarter to release her 2012 album Theatre Is Evil, stating: "I don't think I was wrong but I also don't think that it was that big of a deal." He described the music media as "superficial" and composed of "copy paste bullshit."

Albini has frequently stated his dislike for pop music, and in a 2015 interview told 2SER Sydney that "pop music is for children and idiots". He expressed his loathing for electronic dance music and the entire club scene to techno producer Oscar Powell in 2015, who quoted Albini in a billboard advert for his track "Insomniac" which samples Albini.

Music festivals
Albini has criticized music festivals for their corporatization of popular alternative music. In a 1993 interview, he said about Lollapalooza:
 Lollapalooza is the worst example of corporate encroachment into what is supposed to be the underground. It is just a large scale marketing of bands that pretend to be alternative but are in reality just another facet of the mass cultural exploitation scheme. I have no appreciation or affection for those bands and I have no interest in that whole circle. If Lollapalooza had Jesus Lizard and the Melvins and Fugazi and Slint then you could make a case that it was actually people on the vanguard of music. What it really is is the most popular bands on MTV that are not heavy metal.

Media appearances
Albini is featured in the first episode of the 2014 documentary miniseries Foo Fighters: Sonic Highways, "Chicago", in which Albini is shown talking about being a producer, as well as recording the Foo Fighters song "Something from Nothing".

He has appeared in a number of documentary films and videos about the making of various albums that he has produced, including Josephine by Magnolia Electric Co. (2009), This Is Nowhere by Malojian (2016), Carrier Wave by Porcupine (2019) and In Bed with Medusa by Medusa (2020). Rock vs. Cancer, a 2018 short documentary about the making of the 2012 album The Strain by Teeth, additionally features Albini as the narrator.

Albini was a guest on the audio podcast WTF with Marc Maron in 2015.

The 2019 short documentary Albini Cashes In, part of the Stories from the Felt series for the streaming service PokerGO, is about Albini's 2018 World Series of Poker win.

Other activities
Albini began a cooking and food blog, titled "Mariobatalivoice: What I made Heather for dinner", in March 2011.

Albini is an avid poker player and ranked in 12th place at the 2013 World Series of Poker (WSOP) Seniors Championship. Albini won his first WSOP gold bracelet at the $1,500 Seven-Card Stud at 2018 World Series of Poker (WSOP); he beat out Jeff Lisandro to win $105,629. He won his second gold bracelet at the 2022 WSOP in the $1,500 H.O.R.S.E. event.

Albini also regularly engages in public-speaking appointments for the audio industry.

Personal life
Albini is married to film director Heather Whinna and they work and live in Chicago. His right leg is slightly deformed as a result of a car accident when he was 18.

In 2010, he revealed that he is not an avid consumer of media and watches a lot of cat videos on YouTube, while avoiding feature films.

Albini called himself an atheist in a 2011 interview.

Discography

Works or publications
 "Husker Du?  Only Their Hairdresser Knows for Sure" Article for Matter on Hüsker Dü, published September 1983.
 "I would like to be paid like a plumber" Letter written by Steve Albini to Nirvana in 1992, outlining his working philosophy 
 "Ask a music scene micro celebrity" Steve Albini answers questions about bands and music on a poker forum, The 2+2 Forums, July 7, 2007. 
 "I am Steve Albini, ask me anything" reddit IAmA, May 8, 2012; accessed June 21, 2015.
 "Steve Albini talks to LISTEN: "I try to be an ally in feminism"" Interview in LISTEN, May 2, 2016; accessed August 16, 2016.

References

Further reading
 Azerrad, Michael. Our Band Could Be Your Life: Scenes from the American Indie Underground, 1981–1991. Boston: Little, Brown and Company, 2001; 
 Cameron, Keith. "This Is Pop," MOJO magazine, Issue 90, May 2001.
 King, Braden. Looking for a Thrill: An Anthology of Inspiration. Chicago, IL: Thrill Jockey, 2005. (DVD)

External links

 Electrical Audio official website

1962 births
Living people
American audio engineers
American atheists
American male singer-songwriters
American music journalists
American poker players
Alternative rock guitarists
Noise rock musicians
Post-hardcore musicians
American writers of Italian descent
Medill School of Journalism alumni
Big Black members
Singers from Chicago
Musicians from Missoula, Montana
Writers from Pasadena, California
Pigface members
Writers from Evanston, Illinois
Musicians from Pasadena, California
Musicians from Evanston, Illinois
Journalists from Montana
Guitarists from California
Guitarists from Chicago
Guitarists from Montana
Record producers from Montana
Record producers from Illinois
Record producers from California
Rapeman members
Shellac (band) members
20th-century American guitarists
World Series of Poker bracelet winners
American male non-fiction writers
American male guitarists
21st-century American guitarists
American punk rock singers
American punk rock guitarists
American punk rock bass guitarists
American post-punk musicians
American bloggers
Singer-songwriters from Illinois
Singer-songwriters from California